Christopher Hatton, 1st Viscount Hatton (1632–1706) was an English aristocrat and diplomat.

Career
He succeeded his father, Christopher Hatton, 1st Baron Hatton, as Baron Hatton and also as governor of Guernsey in 1670.

He and his family were living in the governor's official residence, Castle Cornet, in 1672 when its keep and some living quarters were destroyed by an explosion; his mother and wife were killed.  Hatton and his three young daughters were rescued by servant James Chappell.

In 1682, he was created Viscount Hatton, of Gretton, Northamptonshire.

Family
Christopher's younger brother was the botanist Charles Hatton.

He first married on 12 February 1667 to Cecily Tufton and had the following issue:

 Anne (d. 1743), m. Daniel Finch, 2nd Earl of Nottingham

He married secondly Frances (d. 1684) daughter of Sir Henry Yelverton, 2nd Baronet and had one daughter that survived infancy.

His last wife was Elizabeth the daughter of Sir William Haslewood of Maidwell, Northamptonshire and had a large family including two sons:

 William (1690–1760), succeeded to his father's titles and estates
 Henry (c. 1700–1762), who enjoyed the same dignities for a short time after his brother's death.

Succession
Both his sons inherited the title Viscount Hatton in turn: William on his father's death in 1706, and Henry Charles for two years (1760–1762).

When Henry Charles died, the titles became extinct. The family line continues with the Finch-Hattons, earls of Winchelsea and Nottingham, whose ancestor, Daniel Finch, 2nd Earl of Nottingham, married Anne, daughter of the 1st Viscount Hatton.

References

External links
 Kirby Hall

Bibliography

 

1632 births
1706 deaths
17th-century English nobility
18th-century English nobility
Viscounts in the Peerage of England
English MPs 1661–1679
Christopher